Akashathile Paravakal (English:The Birds of the Sky) is a 2001 Malayalam language film produced by Feroz. The film is directed by V. M. Vinu, and stars Kalabhavan Mani and Sindhu Menon in the lead roles along with Kaviyoor Ponnamma, Jagathy Sreekumar, Indrans and I. M. Vijayan. The music was composed by S. Balakrishnan and Rajamani. The film is based on a story written by Johnson Esthappan. The film was commercially successful.

Plot 
The story is based on Chandanakkunnu panchayat, where rabies due to dog bites has become a fearsome epidemic. People in the panchayat seek all ways to kill the affected dogs. The incumbent panchayat president is challenged by Dasappan raising the insecurity the disease has spread in the place. To gain public support, Dasappan brings Udumbu Vasu to the panchayat to kill the dogs. Vasu is lodged in Muthassi's house. Muthassi's granddaughter SreeDevi falls in love with Vasu after hearing about his orphaned life after his mother's death from a dog bite. Meanwhile, Palayar Manikkyam, Sreedevi's father's murderer, makes a ruckus in the house for getting him arrested for murder. This instigates a fight between Vasu and Manikkyam. Within a few days Vasu gets bitten by a dog and gets rabies. Manikkyam tries to use this situation to kill Vasu, but instead Vasu kills him. In order to save Vasu from being killed by the public, Muthassi kills him. Everybody in the village weeps at his death.

Cast 

Kalabhavan Mani as Udumbu Vasu
I. M. Vijayan as Palayar Manikkyam
Sindhu Menon as Sreedevi
Jagathy Sreekumar as Dasappan
K. T. S. Padannayil as Dasappan's father
Indrans as Kuttappan (Dasappan's right-hand)
Kaviyoor Ponnamma as Muthassi
Augustine as Govindhan
C. I. Paul as Raghavan (Panchayat President)
Manka Mahesh as Raghavan's wife
V. M. Vinu as Doctor
Bindhu Varappuzha as Mariyamma

Soundtrack

 "Angadiveedinu"- M. G. Sreekumar
 "Kalabhakuriyitta"- M. G. Sreekumar, Jayachandran
 "Ponnumkudathinu"- K. J. Yesudas, S. Janaki
 "Thathapennu"- Madhu Balakrishnan, K. S. Chithra
 "Kaattunjalidaam"- S. Janaki, M. G. Sreekumar
 "Mooparrkoru"- Madhu Balakrishnan
 "Varuthanteoppam"- Kalabhavan Mani

References

External links
 

2001 films
2000s Malayalam-language films